Scarus dubius, also known as regal parrotfish, is a parrotfish endemic to the Hawaiian Islands.

References

bubius
Fish described in 1828
Taxa named by Edward Turner Bennett
Fish of Hawaii